The Seychelles Billie Jean King Cup team represents Seychelles in Billie Jean King Cup tennis competition and are governed by the Seychelles Tennis Association. They currently compete in the Europe/Africa Zone of Group III.

History
Seychelles competed in its first Billie Jean King Cup in 2022. Their best result was finishing third in their Group III pool in 2022.

Players

Recent performances
Here is the list of all match-ups of the Seychelles participation in the Billie Jean King Cup in 2022.

See also
Billie Jean King Cup

References

External links

Billie Jean King Cup teams
Billie Jean King Cup
Billie Jean King Cup